The Diocese of Ipameri is a Latin Church ecclesiastical territory or diocese of the Catholic Church in Brazil. It is a suffragan diocese in the ecclesiastical province of the metropolitan Archdiocese of Goiânia.

Its cathedral is Catedral Divino Espírito Santo, dedicated to the Holy Spirit, in the episcopal see of Ipameri. The current bishop is José Francisco Rodrigues do Rêgo.

History 
 Established on 11 October 1966 as Diocese of Ipameri, on territory split from its Metropolitan, the Archdiocese of Goiania.
 Lost territory on 1989.03.29 to establish the Diocese of Luziânia

Statistics 
, it pastorally served 299,000 Catholics (93.4% of 320,000 total population) on 296,426 km² in 17 parishes with 33 priests (17 diocesan, 16 religious), 66 lay religious (21 brothers, 45 sisters) and 5 seminarians.

Episcopal Ordinaries 
(all native Brazilians)

Bishops of Ipameri 
 Gilberto Pereira Lopes (1966.11.03 – 1975.12.19), next Titular Archbishop of Aurusuliana (1975.12.19 – 1982.02.10) as Coadjutor Archbishop of Campinas (Brazil) (1975.12.19 – 1982.02.10), succeeding as Metropolitan Archbishop of Campinas (Brazil) (1982.02.10 – retired 2004.06.02)
 Antônio Ribeiro de Oliveira (1975.12.19 – 1985.10.23); previously Titular Bishop of Arindela (1961.08.25 – 1975.12.19) as Auxiliary Bishop of Goiânia (Brazil) (1961.08.25 – 1975.12.19); later Metropolitan Archbishop of Goiânia (Brazil) (1985.10.23 – retired 2002.05.08), died 2017
 Tarcísio Sebastião Batista Lopes, O.F.M. Cap. (1986.12.19 – 1998.07.29), died 2001: previously Bishop of Grajaú (Brazil) (1984.04.04 – 1986.12.19) Apostolic Administrator Archbishop Geraldo do Espírito Santo Ávila (1998.07.29 – 1999.05.19), while Titular Archbishop of Gemellæ in Numidia (1990.10.31 – 1998.03.07) as Archbishop Military Ordinariate of Brazil (1990.10.31 – 2005.11.14); previously Titular Bishop of Gemellæ in Numidia (1977.06.27 – 1990.10.31) as Auxiliary Bishop of Archdiocese of Brasília (Brazil) (1977.06.27 – 1990.10.31)
 Guilherme Antônio Werlang, Missionaries of the Holy Family (M.S.F.) (1999.05.19 – 2018.02.07)), next Bishop of Lages (Brazil) (2018.02.07 – ...).
 José Francisco Rodrigues do Rêgo (2019.05.15 - ...,,)

See also 
 List of Catholic dioceses in Brazil

Sources and external links 

 GCatholic.org, with Google satellite map & HQ picture - data for all sections
 Catholic Hierarchy

Roman Catholic dioceses in Brazil
Religious organizations established in 1966
Roman Catholic Ecclesiastical Province of Goiânia
Roman Catholic dioceses and prelatures established in the 20th century